Monroe High School (MHS) is a public high school in Monroe, Wisconsin, United States. It is part of the School District of Monroe.

Athletics 
The school won state championships in boys' cross country in 1973, 1974 and 1979.

Notable alumni 
 Ken Behring, real estate developer
 Brett Davis, politician
 David G. Deininger, Wisconsin judge and state representative
 Nathan J. Lindsay, United States Air Force major general and astronaut
 Ric Mathias, NFL player

References

External links 
 

Public high schools in Wisconsin
Schools in Green County, Wisconsin